Alaska Territory's at-large congressional district (also District of Alaska's at-large congressional district) was a congressional district created in 1906 to represent the District of Alaska, which was reorganized into the Alaska Territory in 1912. After Alaska's admission to the Union as the 49th state by act of Congress on January 3, 1959, this district evolved into Alaska's at-large congressional district.

In the years following the Alaska Purchase, Alaskans held a series of political conventions focused on sending a representative to the U.S. Congress. The purpose was to lobby mainly for representation in the body, in similar fashion to the later application of the Tennessee Act to lobby for Alaskan statehood, but also for greater autonomy for Alaska. The first convention, held in 1881, saw a non-partisan group send a Democrat (M. D. Ball) to Washington, who worked with a Republican senator (Benjamin Harrison) to craft the organic act which created the District of Alaska. Ball and several subsequent individuals were unable to convince Congress to grant the District a delegate, however. Events changed as the population of Alaska increased around the turn of the 20th century, mainly on account of immigration due to gold rushes.

On May 7, 1906, an act of Congress gave the District of Alaska the authority to elect a Congressional delegate. On August 24, 1912, the District of Alaska was reorganized into an organized incorporated territory and continued to elect delegates until Alaska became a state in 1959.

List of delegates representing the district

See also
 Alaska's at-large congressional district

Notes

References

External links 
 

Former congressional districts of the United States
At-large United States congressional districts
Territory At-large
Constituencies established in 1906
1906 establishments in Alaska
Constituencies disestablished in 1959
1959 disestablishments in Alaska
Lists of Alaska politicians